New Market is an unincorporated community in Highland County, in the U.S. state of Ohio.

History
The first settlement at New Market was made in 1797; the community was named after New Market, Virginia. A post office called New Market was established in 1803, and remained in operation until 1907.

References

Unincorporated communities in Highland County, Ohio
Unincorporated communities in Ohio